Yi-Cheng Wang (born October 9, 1985) is a Taiwanese professional baseball pitcher for the Rakuten Monkeys of the Chinese Professional Baseball League (CPBL).

He attended Chinese Cultural University and represented Chinese Taipei at the 2001 World Youth Baseball Championship, 2009 World Port Tournament, 2009 Asian Baseball Championship, 2009 Baseball World Cup and 2013 World Baseball Classic.

Wang began his professional career with the Yokohama DeNA BayStars of Nippon Professional Baseball in 2010, and played for the club through 2013. In 2013, he joined the Lamigo Monkeys, later rebranded as the Rakuten Monkeys, and has played for the club through the 2020 season.

External links 
 Baseball Reference-minors
 2009 World Port Tournament
 Taiwan Baseball Blog

1985 births
Living people
Lamigo Monkeys players
Rakuten Monkeys players
Nippon Professional Baseball pitchers
People from Pingtung County
Taiwanese expatriate baseball players in Japan
Yokohama BayStars players
Yokohama DeNA BayStars players
2013 World Baseball Classic players